Marseille is a French drama streaming television series created by Dan Franck starring Gérard Depardieu. The series is the first French language original production for Netflix, which ordered the project to series on 10 July 2015. The eight-episode first season premiered worldwide on Netflix on 5 May 2016. A second season was ordered on 6 June 2016. Production for the second season commenced on 18 April 2017. The second season debuted in February 2018. Netflix cancelled the show after 2 seasons.

Plot
After 20 years as mayor of Marseille, Robert Taro (Depardieu) enters into a war of succession with his former protégé turned rival Lucas Barres (Benoît Magimel). Both men are members of the "UPM" party, based on the centre-right UMP (Union for a Popular Movement). A betrayal ignites a bitter war between a master politician and his hungry young protégé in this sweeping tale of corruption, seduction and revenge. Then, the battle for the heart of Marseille heats up as right-wing nationalists gain power and a shadowy conspiracy targets the city's beloved football team.

Cast and English dubbing

Main characters

Side characters

Episodes

Season 1 (2016)

Season 2 (2018)

Release
The show's first season released worldwide on Netflix on 5 May 2016, and the first two episodes have aired on TF1. The second season was released on Netflix on 23 February 2018.

Critical reception
In France, the series received a mostly negative reaction from the press. Pierre Sérisier, writing for Le Monde, called it an "industrial accident". Télérama gave the series a "red card", while Alain Carrazé on Europe 1 referred to it as something from "the 90s" with "cartoonish and ridiculous dialogue".

However, reception outside France was more positive.

References

External links
 Marseille on Netflix
 

French-language Netflix original programming
Television shows set in Marseille
2016 French television series debuts
2018 French television series endings
French political drama television series
Television series about organized crime
Works about organized crime in France